Dosinia subrosea, common name the fine dosinia, is a medium-sized saltwater clam, a marine bivalve mollusc in the family Veneridae, the Venus clams.

References
 Powell A. W. B., New Zealand Mollusca, William Collins Publishers Ltd, Auckland, New Zealand 1979 
 Glen Pownall, New Zealand Shells and Shellfish, Seven Seas Publishing Pty Ltd, Wellington, New Zealand 1979 

Dosinia
Bivalves of New Zealand
Bivalves described in 1835
Taxa named by John Edward Gray